Samsung Galaxy Mini 2 is a smartphone manufactured by Samsung that runs the open source Android 2.3 "Gingerbread" operating system. It was announced and released by Samsung in February 2012. It is available in three colors: black, yellow and orange.

Hardware
Galaxy Mini 2 features the Qualcomm Snapdragon S1 SoC design in an MSM7227A chip. This contains an ARMv7-based ARM Cortex-A5 CPU clocked to a slightly faster speed of up to 800 MHz, and an enhanced Adreno 200 GPU core. The display is a 3.27-inch HVGA TFT LCD screen with a higher pixel density (320×480) than on a previous-generation model. Inclusion of NFC (Near Field Communication) varies by model.

The phone includes a plain 3-megapixel rear camera protected by a hardened scratch-proof glass, but does not include autofocus and flash. Official product literature does not specify the exact camera sensor size beyond "3 MP", though the total pixel count does amount to approximately 3.15 Mpix. The camera supports geotagging and video recording; video is recorded in an H.264 format at VGA resolution (640×480 pixels @ 30 fps).

Further device features include A-GPS for navigation, Bluetooth, USB data transfer and charging via microUSB, and an FM radio with RDS support. The FM radio app has slots for twelve channel presets.

Software upgrade path
Samsung announced on September 24, 2012, that Galaxy Mini 2 was to be updated in the future with Android 4.1 "Jelly Bean", but later abandoned development of Jelly Bean for Mini 2. An unofficial port of CyanogenMod 10.1 (of Jelly Bean branch, v4.2.2) for Galaxy Mini 2 has been rated stable as of the 2013-12-27 release date.

Model variations
There are several different sub-models of Galaxy Mini 2:

Successor models
A little over a year later, Samsung in April 2013 released Samsung Galaxy Fame S6810, and in October 2013 released Samsung Galaxy Fame Lite S6790. Most improvements over Galaxy Mini 2 are incremental. The SoC design is now based on Broadcom BCM21654G. Both phone models are equipped with slightly higher-clocked CPUs (1 GHz/850 MHz), Bluetooth 4.0, Android 4.1.2 Jelly Bean, and 3G connectivity gains HSUPA.

Differing features in Galaxy Fame include a 5 Mpix camera with auto-focus, a front camera, support for up to 64 Gb microSD cards, and NFC or dual-SIM variants depending on model. This model still supports Mini-SIM cards.

Galaxy Fame Lite differs from Galaxy Mini 2 with Micro-SIM support. Inclusion of NFC or the FM radio may vary depending on submodel (some have one or the other, both, or neither). The camera remains at 3.0 Mpix.

A sibling model released in October 2013 is Galaxy Fame Lite Duos (S6792, with L as one known region-specific submodel), which differs by having dual-SIM support.

References

External links 
Samsung Galaxy Mini 2 on m.samsung.com (UK)

Galaxy Mini 2
Galaxy Mini 2
Android (operating system) devices
Mobile phones introduced in 2012
Discontinued smartphones